John Einar "Stor-Klas" Svensson (27 September 1894 – 20 March 1959) was a Swedish ice hockey player, bandy player, footballer and football manager. He competed in the 1920 Summer Olympics. In 1920 he was a member of the Swedish ice hockey team which finished fourth in the Summer Olympics tournament. He played five matches and scored two goals.

From 1935 to 1944, he coached Djurgårdens IF football section.

References

External links
 
profile

1894 births
1959 deaths
Association footballers not categorized by position
Djurgårdens IF Fotboll managers
Ice hockey players at the 1920 Summer Olympics
IK Göta Bandy players
IK Göta Fotboll players
IK Göta Ishockey players
Olympic ice hockey players of Sweden
Swedish bandy managers
Swedish bandy players
Swedish football managers
Swedish footballers
Swedish ice hockey players